Peter Schaffer (born 1962) is an American sports agent/lawyer who represents players in the National Football League, Major League Baseball, PGA Tour, the National Basketball Association, and the National Hockey League.  He is founder and owner of Authentic Athletix, a Colorado-based sports agency, and is known for representing highly drafted players and marquee names. He also owns an athletic combine training facility in Denver.

Schaffer represents active and retired athletes and celebrities, including Pro Football Hall of Famers Barry Sanders, Steve Atwater, Joe Thomas, Joe Mixon, Adam Jones, Randy Gregory, Phil Taylor, Trevor Pryce, Vontaze Burfict, Alfred Williams Rayshawn Jenkins, Joshua Cribbs, C. J. Anderson, Mario Edwards Jr., and Hakeem Nicks. and PGA golfers including two-time PGA tour winner Jonathan Kaye and Shane Bertsch.

Biography

Early years 
Schaffer was born in upstate New York. He attended Cortland High School and then The Hill School, in Pottstown, Pennsylvania on athletic and academic scholarship, graduating in 1980 with honors. Schaffer then attended Franklin and Marshall College, graduating in 1984 with honors while playing both varsity lacrosse and hockey. Schaffer would later be awarded with The Alumni Citation from Franklin and Marshall College in 2019. In 1987, he graduated from Brooklyn Law School. 

In 1988 he played professional lacrosse in the American Lacrosse League (1988) (ALL) for the Denver Rifles. 

His first job out of law school was with the Denver-based law firm of Weller, Freidrich, Ward and Andrews, a litigation firm. After law school in 1988, Schaffer became certified as a Contract Advisor ("Agent") by the National Football League Players Association ("NFLPA"), the NHLPA, and PGA Tour.  During this time he negotiated some of the most lucrative deals in NFL history.

Representation 

Schaffer represents Chad Brown, Trevor Pryce and Joe Thomas. He also represents Willie Roaf, Pro Football Hall of Fame (offensive tackle, New Orleans Saints), Hakeem Nicks (wide receiver, Tennessee Titans), Chad Brown (linebacker, Seattle Seahawks), Jason Gildon (linebacker, Pittsburgh Steelers), C. J. Anderson (Running Back, Denver Broncos), David Diehl (Pro Bowl Offensive Tackle, New York Giants and current Fox Sports Game analyst), Larry Johnson (running back, Kansas City Chiefs), Rudi Johnson (running back, Cincinnati Bengals), Derrick Mason, Wide Receiver, Titans and Ravens, Samari Rolle, Cornerback, Titans and Ravens, Tra Thomas Tackles, Eagles, Lito Sheppard, Cornerback. Eagles, and quarterback New York Giants and current ESPN and Jesse Palmer, Good Morning America studio host.

Other football clients include C. J. Anderson (Running Back, Denver Broncos) and Adam Jones Cornerback, Cincinnati Bengals and Joe Mixon.

Authentic Athletix 
In 2011 Schaffer started his own agency called Authentic Athletix, LLC, a sports and entertainment agency.

Media presence 
Schaffer appears on ABC Nightly News, Fox Sports, the Dan Patrick Show, HBO Real Sports and 60 Minutes. He has also co-hosted shows on KFFN (Denver) and Altitude Sports Network. His thoughts on the NFL can be read regularly in his national column for the Washington Post'''s "Inside the League." He has served as a Professor of Sports Law at the University of Denver and has lectured at Tulane University Law School, University of Colorado Business School, Johnson and Wales University, University of Colorado Law School and the University of New York-Cortland among others. He has also served as Chairman of the Denver Cable Commission and the Denver Professional Lacrosse Commission. He is a member of the Agent Advisory Board of the NFL Players Union and is a member of both the NFLPA and NHLPA.

On August 11, 2015, the Esquire Network premiered a new docu-series titled The Agent'' which follows Schaffer and three other NFL agents as they court potential clients in the months leading up to the NFL draft.  Camera crews documented Schaffer's recruitment of Florida State star defensive end Mario Edwards Jr. and 2014 Thorpe Award winner Gerod Holliman of Louisville.  The series includes footage of Schaffer playing golf with NFL star and client Adam Jones, a trip to a men's lacrosse tournament where Schaffer convinces his teammates to take the Wonderlic test with his new clients and even captures Schaffer watching former Washington State quarterback Connor Halliday suffer a broken leg shortly after contacting him as a potential client.

References 

1962 births
American sports agents
Living people
The Hill School alumni
Brooklyn Law School alumni